Ethionine is a non-proteinogenic amino acid structurally related to methionine, with an ethyl group in place of the methyl group.  

Ethionine is an antimetabolite and methionine antagonist. It prevents amino acid incorporation into proteins and interferes with cellular use of adenosine triphosphate (ATP).  Because of these pharmacological effects, ethionine is highly toxic and is a potent carcinogen.

Ethionine has been found to naturally occur in the edible pulp of the durian fruit, and postulated to be a biosynthetic precursor for ethanethiol and other strong odorants found in the fruit.

References

Carcinogens
Sulfur amino acids
Thioethers
Toxic amino acids
Antimetabolites